Samadov (Azerbaijani: Səmədov, Russian: Самадов) is an Asian masculine surname, its feminine counterpart is Samadova. It may refer to
Abdujalil Samadov (1949–2004), prime minister of Tajikistan 
Alibay Samadov (born 1982), Russian-born Azerbaijani weightlifter
Fazila Samadova (1929-2020), Azerbaijani scientist
Ibragim Samadov (born 1968), Soviet weightlifter
Javid Samadov (born 1987), Azerbaijani opera singer
Ogtay Samadov (born 1952), Azerbaijani scientist